Dekanovec is a village and municipality in Međimurje County, Croatia.

Dekanovec is the only village in the municipality. It is by territory the smallest municipality in Croatia. It is located between Novakovec and Domašinec, around 14 kilometres north-east of Čakovec, the seat and largest city of Međimurje County. The Mura River and borders with both Hungary and Slovenia are also close to the village. In the 2011 census, the village was populated by 774 people.

References

Municipalities of Croatia
Populated places in Međimurje County